Volley Group d'Arté Averbode are a former Belgian volleyball club based in Averbode.

The A squad played in the Liga, the highest level of Belgian men's volleyball, before being declared bankrupt at the end of the 2010-11 season.

The team has played several times in the Challenge Cup, formerly known as CEV Cup.

Names 
 1969-1999 – Everbeur Volley
 1999-? – De Belleman Nissan Averbode
 ?-2004 – Pecotex De Belleman Averbode
 2004-2005 – VC Averbode
 2005-2006 – Axion Ski Team Averbode
 2006-2007 – Slaapcomfort Beets-Patteet Averbode
 2007-2009 – VC Handelsgids Averbode
 2009-2010 – Group D'Arté Averbode
 2010-2011 – Toyota Wouters Averbode

Last squad
Coach:  Dieter Melis

External links
Official site 

Belgian volleyball clubs